Patricia Agatha Butenis (born 1953) is an American diplomat.  In 2014 she retired with the rank of Career Minister.

Early life and education
Butenis was born in New Jersey in 1953 to Charles P. and Haifa Butenis (née Michalezka). The eldest of three daughters, she grew up in Atco, New Jersey. She earned a Bachelor of Arts degree in anthropology from the University of Pennsylvania and a Master of Arts degree in international relations from Columbia University.

Career
Butenis joined the U.S. Foreign Service in 1980 and served consular tours in Karachi, Pakistan; San Salvador, El Salvador; New Delhi, India; and Bogotá, Colombia.

As the deputy chief of mission at the U.S. Embassy in Baghdad from 2007 to 2009, Butenis won the State Department's Baker-Wilkins Award as the Outstanding Deputy Chief of Mission (2008).

She was deputy chief of mission at the U.S. Embassy in Islamabad, and after that, the U.S. Ambassador to Bangladesh from April 13, 2006 to June 23, 2007. From 2009 to 2012, Butenis was the U.S. Ambassador to Sri Lanka and the U.S. Ambassador to the Maldives.

Butenis' final career assignment was as the Dean of the School of Professional and Area Studies in the Foreign Service Institute.

Diplomatic-cable leak by WikiLeaks
Butenis sparked controversy in Sri Lanka in late 2009 when WikiLeaks — an international new-media, non-profit organization that publishes submissions of private, secret, and classified media from anonymous news sources and news leaks — disclosed diplomatic cables sent by her on verifying the accountability of war crimes that allegedly happened in the final stages of Sri Lankan Civil War (1983–2009).

WikiLeaks also leaked Butenis's Bangladesh mission, where she worked during a volatile political situation in 2006-07 period  and met political leaders including Sheikh Hasina, Khaleda Zia and Mukhlesur Rahman Chowdhury and there were moves to solve the political deadlock. She had series of meetings with various leaders including military officials.

References

External links
 srilanka.usembassy.gov, official website the Embassy of the United States — Sri Lanka and Maldives
 

1953 births
Living people
School of International and Public Affairs, Columbia University alumni
Ambassadors of the United States to Bangladesh
Ambassadors of the United States to the Maldives
Ambassadors of the United States to Sri Lanka
University of Pennsylvania alumni
United States Foreign Service personnel
American women ambassadors
21st-century American diplomats
21st-century American women